Allahabad is a town of Nawabshah District in the southern Sindh province of Pakistan. It is located at 26°53'30N 67°45'0E.

References

Dadu District
Populated places in Sindh